Max McQueen may refer to:

 Max McQueen (Hollyoaks), a character on the soap opera Hollyoaks
 Max McQueen (footballer) (1915–1972), Australian rules footballer